Nude (ヌード Nuudo) is the second studio album by Japanese singer-songwriter Aco, released on 21 April 1997.

All music and lyrics by Aco.

Track listing
 
 
 "DROP"
 
 
 
 
  
 
 "DEEP KISS"

References

1997 albums
Aco (musician) albums